Stefanos Natsinas  (1910–1976) was a former Greek politician.

Born in Constantinople,  he grew up in Thessaloniki, Greece. He was the son of Theodoros Natsinas, Inspector General of Middle Education in Greece.

He studied law at the University of Thessaloniki and practiced his profession until 29 October 1961 when he was elected, (while being for the first time candidate), as a Kozani MP of the Greek Parliament for National Radical Union of Konstantinos Karamanlis.

He was elected twice as MP and also served as prefect of Euboea,  the second largest of the Greek Aegean Islands and the second largest Greek island overall in area and population, after Crete.

Serving in Ministry of Public Works 

He served as a General Secretary for Greek Ministry of Public Works at an era Greece was having under construction many expansions of country's infrastructure.

(Middle picture at the Opening of a new Pipeline at Keratsini, with Prime Minister Konstantinos Karamanlis).

Serving in Ministry of Commerce 

Later he served also as a General Secretary for Greek  Ministry of Commerce.

(At 3rd picture visiting the Central Market of Athens with Prime Minister Konstantinos Karamanlis).

External links
 Opening of Omonoia Square Works with Prime Minister Konstantinos Karamanlis
Founding of Siatista's Technical Schools
 Opening of a new Pipeline at Keratsini, arriving by car with Prime Minister Konstantinos Karamanlis

1910 births
1976 deaths
National Radical Union politicians
Greek Macedonians
Recipients of the Order of George I
Constantinopolitan Greeks
Greek MPs 1961–1963
Emigrants from the Ottoman Empire to Greece
Politicians from Thessaloniki
Politicians from Istanbul